The Gold Cure is a 1919 American silent comedy film, directed by John H. Collins. It stars Viola Dana, John McGowan, and Elsie MacLeod, and was released on January 6, 1919.

Cast list
 Viola Dana as Annice Paisch
 John McGowan as Vance Duncan
 Elsie MacLeod as Edna Lawson
 Howard Hall as Doctor Rodney Paisch
 Fred Jones as Robert Cord
 William B. Davidson as Michael Darcy
 Franklyn Hanna as Michael Connors
 Ed Mack as the gardener
 Julia Hurley as the gardener's wife
 George Dowling as Dr. Dumbbell

References

External links 
 
 
 

Silent American comedy films
1919 comedy films
1919 films
American silent feature films
American black-and-white films
Metro Pictures films
Films directed by John H. Collins
1910s English-language films
1910s American films